WCOY is a 100,000-watt country radio station based in Quincy, Illinois, broadcasting on 99.5 FM.

History
WTAD-FM went on the air in 1948, four years after having filed for its construction permit on 44.1 MHz—before FM was relocated to 88–108 MHz. It was owned by Lee Enterprises as a sister to WTAD 930 AM.

When New York's WBAI—also on 99.5—was sabotaged and fell off air in 1967, it borrowed a crystal from WTAD-FM in order to resume operation. WTAD-FM became WQCY on December 30, 1974.

Lee exited the Hannibal-Quincy market in 1986, selling KHQA-TV to Benedek Broadcasting and WTAD-WQCY radio for $1.1 million to Noble Broadcast Corporation, which operated as Eastern Broadcasting. The group was purchased three years later (later known as Tele-Media Broadcasting).
In 1997, Tele-Media was purchased by Citadel, Citadel sold its Quincy cluster the next year to STARadio Corporation. In 1999, the hot AC format and WQCY call letters moved to 103.9 FM, formerly WMOS; programming consultant Keith Bansemer flipped the station's format to country using the "Coyote Country" slogan.

See also
List of media outlets in Quincy, Illinois

References

External links
Official website

FCC History Cards for WCOY

COY
Radio stations established in 1948